This is a list of institutions of higher education in Arunachal Pradesh:

As of 27 october 2022, Arunachal Pradesh has one central university, one state university, one deemed university, seven private universities and one state private Open University.

 granted deemed university status

Architecture colleges

Engineering colleges

Medical colleges

Law colleges

Degree colleges

Education

Autonomous institution 
 National Institute of Technology, Arunachal Pradesh

References 

Arunachal Pradesh
Education
Education in Arunachal Pradesh